Tyushtya IPA ['tʲuʃtʲɑ] (IPA ['tʲuʃtʲenʲ]) is Moksha demigod, son of Atäm (Thunder God) and mortal girl. Tyushtya is able to turn into White horse. The good harvest depends on him. He was the first Moksha King chosen by clan elders. The first Moksha title for the king derives from his name  IPA [tʲuʃ'tʲɑn].

Epic
Epic based on three archaic runes first recorded by Heikki Paasonen in the beginning of 20th century and printed posthumously in 1938–1981.

Archaic runes
He is a young lad during new moon, mature in the full moon, and old man during waning moon.
The Sun is on his forehead and the Moon is on the back of his head, star is on the tip of each hair. He was born with an iron heel, back of the head of stone, wire wrapped knees. Iron-beaked Seer Raven is among his helpers as well as White Horse, White Swan, and Queen Bee. He likes musicians. When he is in a good mood everyone sings and dances. He holds a stick in one hand and torama (great horn) in another.
According to Variant 1 mythical tradition Tyshtya grows old and ascends to heaven to meet their parents leaving his torama (His Great horn's name) that tells his will.

The basic plots
A. Being chosen as a King
B. Fighting a foreign enemy
C. Defeating divine birth opponents
D. Ascension to Heaven
E. Leading his people to new better lands.

Later runes
He lives in his palace in the East. He is the reachest one in the whole world. He wears white shirt and golden clothes. In later runes' variants Queen Bee warns him he would be killed by a miraculously born child. His enemy is 70-years Erzya Widow's son born with an iron heel. He uses torama to call everyone to join the battle with the enemies who want to take the homeland. His torama's voice is like thunder, like the voice of the ancestors. In Variant B tradition he leads Mokshas to the East, away from Russian pressure. He parts the sea and let Mokshas to cross it. The Supreme God helps him. When he leads his people to the new lands the Supreme God feeds them, like it is said in the Bible. When Tyushtya grows old he asks his people where do they want them to die. They say they don't want to witness his death. He departs and leaves his torama they might use to call him with when the enemy comes. Then he returnes with his army and that will be the ultimate battle before the doomsday.

Tyushtya in Erzya epic tradition
The epic might be formed first among Mokshas and later borrowed by Erzyas. In Erzya mythology, Tyushtya is a Moon god, son of Nishke (Thunder god) and mortal girl Litova. His age changes every month, following the phases of the Moon.

Tyshtya in erzya literature

Vasily Radayev compiled "Tyushtya" epic out of Moksha and Erzya epic songs in 1991. Aleksandr Sharonov compiled "Mastorava" epic out of Moksha and Erzya epic songs in 1994.

Indo-Iranian influence reflected in the epic
Mokshas are known for wearing pendants with duck legs in Early Middle Ages. It reflects the Myth of the Great Bird. They wore as well animal style horse-shaped decorations and horse head-shaped ones with duck legs, like amulets and combs.

Horse cult and horse sacrifice
Mokshas had the Horse cult from the ancient times. The Horse cult among Mordvin Tatars was described in 1591 by Giles Fletcher:  In Tsna Moksha gravefields dated 13–14th c horse graves are often as well as amulets and combs with horse heads. Similar cults in Mokshas and Udmurts are idenfied as Indo-Iranian heritage

Divine twins

Zoroastrian customs
As per Mary Boyce Indo-Iranians lived like nomads stretching from Lower Volga to the North Kazakhstan yet around 1700 BC (time when Rigveda should be set) Traces of Indo-Iranians still can be found in Moksha language, for instance the word  can be traced back to Iranian ahur in Ahura Mazda. The word  and archaic  are cognates with Ancient Indian bhagas 'happiness' and Avestan baγa 'God'. Even  is tied with Aryan *агуа 'Arya'. Elements of Zoroastrianism can be found as well in wedding or burial rites and archaic fire cult.

In popular culture

In 2021, Ukrainian Rock Against Communism band Komu Vnyz recorded a song called "Appeal to Tyushtya", based on a poem written by Olyosh and set to music by Alina Podgornova.

See also
Tishtrya
Divine twins
Horse sacrifice
Queen Bee

References

Sources

External links
Mastorava Epic

Fertility gods
Sky and weather gods
Ancient Iranian gods
Horses in mythology
Characters in epic poems
Heroes in mythology and legend
Legendary monarchs